William John Metcalfe (6 October 1891 – 31 July 1965) was an English teacher, short story writer and novelist from Norfolk, who twice emigrated to the United States. His stories have been said to "build up a unique sense of unease."

Biography
John Metcalfe was born in Heacham, Norfolk, on 6 October 1891. He studied philosophy at the University of London, graduating in 1913. Metcalfe then taught in Paris until 1914.

War and after
During the First World War, he served in the Royal Naval Division, the Royal Naval Air Service, and then in the Royal Air Force.

After the war, Metcalfe taught for five years at Highgate Junior School in London and began writing. His first book, The Smoking Leg and Other Stories, published in 1925, contains several noted stories, including the title story, "The Bad Lands", "Nightmare Jack" and "The Double Admiral". After its publication, he abandoned teaching for writing full-time.

Emigration
Metcalfe emigrated to the United States in 1928, where he wrote Arm's Length while serving as a barge captain on the East River. On 17 March 1930, Metcalfe married the American novelist Evelyn Scott. Metcalfe's second collection, Judas and Other Stories features several horror stories. They include "Mortmain", about a man who believes he is being haunted by the ghost of his wife's first husband.

After service in World War II in the British Royal Air Force, Metcalfe taught in schools in Dorset and Hampstead before returning to the United States, where he was a teacher in Connecticut and New York.

In the 1950s, Metcalfe discussed with August Derleth the possibility of having a third collection of his fiction published by Arkham House. This collection (to be entitled The Feasting Dead and other Stories) never appeared, but Arkham House did publish The Feasting Dead as a standalone novel. Derleth also included several of Metcalfe's stories in his anthologies.

Return to UK
Evelyn Scott died in August 1963, having suffered from heart disease, a lung tumour, and mental health problems. Metcalfe suffered a breakdown after her death and received hospital treatment. On his release in October 1964 he returned to England, where he died on 31 July 1965, after a fall.

"Subtle, finely crafted"
Although Metcalfe is best known as a writer of horror stories, he also wrote novels and poetry. T. E. D. Klein described him as a "writer of subtle, finely crafted supernatural tales, many of them about lonely misfits out of step with their times." Brian Stableford noted how Metcalfe's stories "build up a unique sense of unease."

Works

Novels
Brenner's Boy (1932)
Arm's Length
Spring Darkness (US title: Mrs Condover)
Foster-Girl (US title: Sally)
All Friends Are Strangers
The Feasting Dead (1954) (reprinted 2014 by Valancourt Books)

Collections
The Smoking Leg, and Other Stories (1925)
Judas, and Other Stories (1931)
Nightmare Jack and Other Tales (1998)

References

External links

1891 births
1965 deaths
English fantasy writers
English horror writers
English science fiction writers
Alumni of the University of London
Royal Navy personnel of World War I
Royal Naval Air Service personnel of World War I
Royal Air Force personnel of World War II
People from Heacham
British male poets
English male short story writers
English short story writers
English male novelists
20th-century English poets
20th-century English novelists
20th-century British short story writers
20th-century English male writers
English male non-fiction writers
British emigrants to the United States